Challenger Island is an island lying just north of Murray Island, off the west coast of Graham Land. The name was used in 1906 by J. Gunnar Andersson of the Swedish Antarctic Expedition under Otto Nordenskiöld, 1901–04.

See also 
 List of Antarctic and sub-Antarctic islands

References
 

Islands of Graham Land
Danco Coast